A fishhook is a device for catching fish.  Fishhook or fish hook may also refer to:

Geography
Antarctica:
 Fishhook Ridge, a ridge on the east side of Sobral Peninsula

Cambodia:
 Fishhook (Cambodia), a salient of Kampong Cham Province that protrudes into Vietnam

United States:
 Fishhook, Alaska, a census-designated place (CDP) in Matanuska-Susitna Borough
 Fishhook, Illinois, an unincorporated town in Pike County
 Fishhook Lake, a lake in Minnesota
 Fish Hook River, a tributary of the Shell River in Minnesota
 Fishhooks Wilderness, a wilderness area in Arizona

Botany
 Fishhook cactus, a name for any hook-spined species of the genus Mammillaria
 Fishhook barrel cactus (Ferocactus wislizeni), a hook-spined cylindrical cactus
 Fishhook waterflea (Cercopagis pengoi), a species of planktonic crustacean

Other uses
 Fish-hooking, a martial-arts technique
 Fish Hooks, an American animated television series
 Strict conditional, a mathematical conditional marked with the logic symbol ⥽
 Fishhook R, the informal name of the symbol for the alveolar tap in the International Phonetic Alphabet
 Jack (playing card), in poker
 Lari (fish hook money), objects serving as coins in areas around the Arabian Sea
 Samuel "Fish Hook" Mulford, a colonial New York legislator and merchant
 A common opening move in the game of Othello (game)